Civil mobilization is the legal compulsion for civilians to work, in distinction to military mobilization. It has been used on a number of occasions by a number of governments. This generally makes striking illegal for the duration of the mobilization.

Belgium 1964
To prevent a doctors strike, the Belgium government, in April 1964, issued a civil mobilization order for hospital doctors and military doctors.

Greece 2010-2015
In Greece, civil mobilization orders were made for dock workers, teachers and power workers .

Israel (1967 and onward) 
During 1967, the Israeli government passed legislation allowing for emergency civil mobilization. This legislation allows the Ministry of Defence, the Ministry of Internal Security and since the Corona Epidemic, the Ministry of Health as well. The Israeli legislation allows for the mandatory employment of employees in "vital industries", responsible for sustaining the Israeli population and the war effort, such as food, armaments etc.

See also
Civil conscription

References

Civil rights and liberties